Ayngaran is a 2022 Indian Tamil-language action drama film written and directed by Ravi Arasu and produced by Common Man Presents. The film stars G. V. Prakash Kumar and Mahima Nambiar with a supporting cast including Kaali Venkat, Aruldoss, Aadukalam Naren and Hareesh Peradi. The film's music is composed by G. V. Prakash Kumar himself, with cinematography handled by Saravanan Abimanyu and editing done by Raja Mohammed.

Cast

 G. V. Prakash Kumar as Mathimaaran 
 Mahima Nambiar as Madhumitha
 Kaali Venkat as Ezhumalai
 Aruldoss as Intellectual Property Officer
 Aadukalam Naren as Perumalsamy, Mathimaaran's father
 Hareesh Peradi as Police inspector Manickam
 Abhishek Vinod as Magudi
 Siddhartha Shankar as Moorthy
 G. Marimuthu as Minister
 George Maryan as Bus ticket collector
 Saravana Subbiah as Kid Rescue Department Lead
 Azhagam Perumal as Police officer
 Jathisha as Ammukutty
 Ravi Venkataraman as Police officer
 Rail Ravi as PWD worker
 Robo Chandru as PWD worker

Soundtrack
The soundtrack and score is composed by G. V. Prakash Kumar and the album featured four songs.

Release
The film was scheduled to be released in theatres on 5 May 2022, but  was postponed to 12 May 2022 due to lack of adequate screens. The film was released after a three year delay and received positive reviews from critics.

Reception
The film opened to positive reviews from critics. The Times of India wrote that "On the whole, Ayngaran is definitely a film that speaks about a worthy cause, but it could have been made even better". Cinema Express opined that "Convenient turns and poor writing affects this good-intentioned film that speaks about the misfortune small inventors face". Behindwoods rated the film with 2.75/5 stating that, "Ayngaran is a film with strong performances and characterization, instead of three subplots, had the film stuck to one, we would have gotten a more crisp, tight film. Nevertheless, the messaging at the end is too honest and when the end credits roll, you'll have something to take away from Ayngaran. Overall Ayngaran is engaging with good performances and delivers an important message." A Critic from OTT Play gave 2.5 stars out of 5 and noted that "  Ayngaran is a decent attempt that ends up as a movie which entertains in parts. Though there are engaging moments, more detailing of characters would have made it a better movie."

However,G Gowtham Critic from India Herald mentioned that " In the second half, all of the characters are given sufficient closure, making the film more convincing. The protagonist's battles with all of his foes are likewise well-written"Critic from Dinamalar gave 3 stars out of 5

References

External links 
 

2020s Tamil-language films
2022 action thriller films